Vorios Hellas was a Hansa A Type cargo ship which was built as Sanga in 1944 by Lübecker Flenderwerke AG, Lübeck, Germany for Deutsche Afrika Linie, Hamburg . She was seized as a prize of war in 1945, passing to the Ministry of War Transport and renamed Empire Gatwick. She was allocated to Greece in 1947 and was renamed Vorios Hellas. She was sold to Hellenic Lines in 1948. She was sold and scrapped in 1974.

Description

The engine was built by Waggon- und Maschinenbau GmbH, Görlitz.

History
Sanga was a Hansa A Type cargo ship built in 1944 as yard number 403 by Lübecker Flenderwerke AG, Lübeck, Germany for Deutsche Afrika Linie, Hamburg. She was completed in July 1944. Her port of registry was Hamburg.

In May 1945, Sanga was seized as a prize of war at Copenhagen, Denmark. The Code Letters GNMT and United Kingdom Official Number 180763 were allocated. Her port of registry was London and she was operated under the management of J T Salvesen Ltd., Leith.

In 1947, Empire Gatwick was allocated to Greece. The Greek government sold her in 1948 to Hellenic Lines and was renamed Vorios Hellas. With their introduction in the 1960s, Vorios Hellas was allocated the Lloyd's Register Number 5383691. She was sold in 1974 to Papageorgiou Bros, Piraeus. She was scrapped in April 1974 by Centas Celik, Gemlik, Turkey.

References

External links
Colour photograph of Vorios Hellas.

1943 ships
Ships built in Germany
World War II merchant ships of Germany
Steamships of Germany
Empire ships
Ministry of War Transport ships
Merchant ships of the United Kingdom
Steamships of the United Kingdom
Merchant ships of Greece
Steamships of Greece